Giorgio De Maria (1924 - 2009) was an Italian musician and author. He is best known for his 1977 novel The Twenty Days of Turin. He was part of the musical group Cantacronache.

References

1924 births
2009 deaths
Writers from Turin
Italian male novelists
20th-century Italian novelists
Musicians from Turin
20th-century Italian male musicians
20th-century Italian male writers